David Cuzens (11 December 1932 – 22 October 2021) was an Australian rules football player who played in the VFL between 1957 and 1961 for the Richmond Football Club.

After leaving Richmond he returned to his home town of Perth where he played for and was senior coach of Subiaco in 1962 and 1963. In 1964 he played for one last season in the WAFL, this time for East Perth.

References

 Hogan P: The Tigers Of Old, Richmond FC, Melbourne 1996

External links
 
 

1932 births
2021 deaths
Richmond Football Club players
Subiaco Football Club players
East Perth Football Club players
Jack Dyer Medal winners
Kalgoorlie City Football Club players
Subiaco Football Club coaches
Australian rules footballers from Western Australia
People from Kalgoorlie